Paul Louis Denis Bellot (7 June 1876 in Paris – 5 July 1944 in Montreal) was a French monk and modern architect.

Biography
He became an architect in 1900 having studied at the École des Beaux-Arts. In 1902 he became a monk of the Benedictines of Solesmes. These monks were in exile in England, and Bellot began building Quarr Abbey on the Isle of Wight.

In the Netherlands Bellot designed St. Paul's Abbey, Oosterhout, for the Order. He designed several churches in the Netherlands, France, Belgium, Canada and Portugal. Most of these are built largely of concrete or brick which were his preferred materials.

Bellot was a member of L'Arche, an organisation whose goal it was to use modern materials and art for religious purposes. In Canada, where he moved in 1937, he influenced several architects (i.e. Dom Claude-Marie Côté, also a Benedictine monk, and Adrien Dufresne, a layperson) and his architectural influence became known as "Bellotism".

His ideas are expounded in Propos d'un bâtisseur du Bon Dieu which was published posthumously in 1949; it is based on lectures he gave in Canada in 1934.

Chief works

 St. Paul's Abbey, Oosterhout, the Netherlands, 1906–1907
 Quarr Abbey, Isle of Wight, 1907–1911
 At Comines, the church of Saint Chrysolus was built from 1925 to 1929 in collaboration with Maurice Storez.
 At Audincourt, the church of Notre-Dame de l'Immaculée Conception, 1932, was an early building in reinforced concrete.
 At Solesmes Abbey, the new library, the gallery of the great cloister and the lavatorium
 The chapel of the seminary of Saint Louis, on the domain of Saint Hubert, Neuvy-sur-Barangeon, Cher, 1936
 At Suresnes in the garden city, the church of Notre-Dame de la Paix was dedicated in 1936.
 Basilica of Saint-Joseph-des-Fins at Annecy
 The Priory of Saint Bathilda at Vanves, between 1934 and 1936
 The Château du Grand Chavanon in Neuvy-sur-Barangeon, between 1935 and 1937.
 The church Nossa Senhora da Conceição in Porto, Portugal, 1939–1947
 In Saint-Benoît-du-Lac, the Saint Benedict Abbey
 In Montreal the completion of the dome and  exterior of the basilica of Saint Joseph's Oratory.

Filmography
 François Brault and Guy L. Coté made a film about Dom Bellot at Quebec in 1987: Dom Bellot, architecte, 1876–1943.

References

External links
Dom Bellot, monk and architect
Bellotism

1876 births
1944 deaths
20th-century French architects
Benedictine monks
French ecclesiastical architects
Architects from Paris